Irons may refer to:

 Irons (surname), a list of people and fictional characters
 The Irons, a nickname for West Ham United FC
 The Irons, a nickname for English heavy metal band Iron Maiden
 Leg irons, a kind of physical restraint used on the feet or ankles
 "the irons", colloquial name of a Halligan bar combined with a fire axe 
 Irons, Michigan, United States, an unincorporated community
 Irons Run, Ohio, United States, a stream

See also
 In irons (sailing), the term for a sailing ship stalled when heading into the wind